Kairos is an Austrian record label that specializes in contemporary classical music. Its recordings have received multiple awards, including the Diapason d'Or. It was founded by Barbara Fränzen and Peter Oswald in 1999, and in 2015, became part of Paladino Media, a company owned by Austrian cellist Martin Rummel. The label's main cover artists are Jakob Gasteiger, Erwin Bohatsch, and Enrique Fuentes.

Artists

Composers

Conductors

Orchestras, ensembles, soloists

Awards
 Diapason d’Or
 Preis der deutschen Schallplattenkritik
 International Piano Award
 Choc du Monde
 Grand Prix du Disque

External links
 

Austrian record labels